Luxo ASA is a Norwegian manufacturer of lamps.  Based in Oslo, it has sales throughout Europe and North America, with production plants in Norway, Sweden and Keila, Estonia. The company was founded in 1934 and was listed on the Oslo Stock Exchange.

In 1937, Jac Jacobsen, the founder of Luxo, invented the Luxo L-1 lamp (a modification of the earlier Anglepoise lamp). The lamp was the inspiration for the 1986 animated short film, Luxo Jr., by Pixar Animation Studios. The short subsequently became the subject of a lawsuit from Luxo.

See also

External links

References

1934 establishments in Norway
companies formerly listed on the Oslo Stock Exchange
design companies established in 1934
manufacturing companies based in Oslo
manufacturing companies established in 1934